is a Japanese manga series written and illustrated by Hirohiko Araki. It was originally serialized in Shueisha's shōnen manga magazine Weekly Shōnen Jump from 1987 to 2004, and was transferred to the monthly seinen manga magazine Ultra Jump in 2005. The series is divided into nine story arcs, each following a new protagonist bearing the "JoJo" nickname. JoJo's Bizarre Adventure is the largest ongoing manga series published by Shueisha by number of volumes, with its chapters collected in 131 tankōbon volumes as of September 2021.

A 13-episode original video animation series adapting the manga's third part, Stardust Crusaders, was produced by A.P.P.P. and released from 1993 to 2002. The studio later produced an anime film adapting the first part, Phantom Blood, which was released in theaters in Japan in 2007. In October 2012, an anime television series produced by David Production adapting Phantom Blood and Battle Tendency began broadcast on Tokyo MX. As of December 2022, the studio has produced five seasons consisting of 190 total episodes adapting through the manga's sixth part, Stone Ocean. A live-action film based on the fourth part, Diamond Is Unbreakable, was released in Japan in 2017.

JoJo's Bizarre Adventure is well-known for its art style and poses; frequent references to Western popular music and fashion; and battles centered around Stands, psycho-spiritual manifestations with unique supernatural abilities. The series had over 120 million copies in circulation as of December 2021, making it one of the best-selling manga series in history, and it has spawned a media franchise including one-shot manga, light novels, and video games. The manga, TV anime, and live-action film are licensed in North America by Viz Media, which has produced various English-language releases of the series since 2005.

Plot

The universe of JoJo's Bizarre Adventure is a reflection of the real world with the added existence of supernatural forces and beings. The narrative of JoJo's Bizarre Adventure is split into parts with independent stories and different characters. Each of the series' protagonists is a member of the Joestar family, whose mainline descendants possess a star-shaped birthmark above their left shoulder blade and a name that can be abbreviated to the titular "JoJo". The first six parts take place within a single continuity whose generational conflict stems from the rivalry between Jonathan Joestar and Dio Brando, while the latter three parts take place in an alternate universe where the Joestar family tree is heavily altered.

 Part 1: 
Volumes 1–5, 44 chapters. In late 19th-century England, Jonathan Joestar, the young son of a wealthy landowner, meets his new adopted brother Dio Brando, who loathes him and plans to usurp him as heir to the Joestar family. When Dio's attempts are thwarted, he transforms himself into a vampire using an ancient Stone Mask and destroys the Joestar estate. Jonathan embarks on a journey, meets new allies, and masters the  martial arts technique to stop Dio, who has made world domination his new goal.

 Part 2: 
Volumes 5–12, 69 chapters. In 1938, a German expedition discovers and awakens a Pillar Man, a powerful humanoid whose race created the Stone Mask. The Pillar Man kills the researchers and escapes to awaken the other Pillar Men so that they may regain dominance over humanity by obtaining the Red Stone of Aja. Joseph Joestar, Jonathan's grandson, unites with new allies and masters Hamon to defeat the Pillar Men.

 Part 3: 
Volumes 13–28, 152 chapters. In 1989, Dio Brando (now referred to as "DIO") awakens after his tomb is salvaged from the ocean. Because Dio had managed to capture Jonathan's body,  awaken in Jonathan's descendants, consisting of Joseph, his daughter Holly Kujo, and grandson Jotaro Kujo. Holly, however, is unable to cope with her own Stand, and has only 50 days to live. Jotaro, Joseph, and their new allies Mohammad Advol, Noriyaki Kakyoin, Jean Pierre Polnareff and Iggy, set out to defeat Dio before this deadline expires, and encounter Dio's henchmen along the way.

 Part 4: 
Volumes 29–47, 174 chapters. In 1999, the Joestar family learns that Joseph has an illegitimate son, Josuke Higashikata, who lives in the fictional Japanese town of Morioh. Josuke learns of a mystical Bow and Arrow that bestows Stands upon those struck by its arrowheads. As they hunt down the Bow and Arrow, Josuke and his allies encounter a serious threat in the form of the Stand-using serial killer Yoshikage Kira.

 Part 5: 
Volumes 47–63, 155 chapters. In 2001, in Naples, Italy, Giorno Giovanna is the son of Dio, conceived while he was in possession of Jonathan Joestar's body. Giorno seeks to become a mafia boss in order to eliminate drug dealers who sell their wares to children. His team, which consists of Stand users, Bruno Bucciarati, Leone Abbachio, Narancia Ghirga, Guido Mista and (later) Pannacota Fugo, must confront the mafia boss Diavolo and protect his daughter Trish Una, whom Diavolo intends to kill in order to hide his identity.

 Part 6: 
Volumes 64–80, 158 chapters. In 2011, near Port St. Lucie, Florida, Jotaro Kujo's daughter Jolyne Cujoh is framed for murder and sent to prison. She works together with other Stand-using prisoners and her father to hunt down prison chaplain Father Enrico Pucci, loyalist to Dio, who seeks the creation of a new universe shaped to his and Dio's will.

 Part 7: 
Volumes 81–104, 95 chapters. In an alternate timeline's 1890, United States President Funny Valentine holds a cross-country horse race with a $50 million reward to the winner. Valentine intends to use the race to gather the scattered parts of a holy corpse for his own nationalistic ends. Racers Gyro Zeppeli and Johnny Joestar uncover Valentine's ploy and must defend themselves from his hired assassins.

 Part 8: 
Volumes 105–131, 110 chapters. Set in the same universe as Steel Ball Run, in 2012, the town of Morioh has been devastated by the 2011 Tōhoku earthquake and tsunami, which has caused mysterious faults colloquially known as the "Wall Eyes" to appear in town. Local college student Yasuho Hirose discovers a young man buried in the rubble and nicknames him "Josuke". Suffering from amnesia, Josuke tries to uncover the secret of his past as he is also confronted with the activities of a local crime syndicate and their leader, Toru, which sells the fruit of a mysterious Locacaca tree, capable of healing people and then "taking" something in return.

 Part 9: 
The ninth part began serialization on February 17, 2023. In modern day Hawaii, siblings Jodio Joestar and Dragona Joestar work together in illegal activity to provide for and protect their mother. Jodio declares that this story is about him becoming filthy rich.

Production

For JoJo's Bizarre Adventure, Araki wanted to use a classical method as a base before introducing modern elements. As an example, he often draws in a realistic style but uses surreal colors. Araki has been aiming to draw real spirits in JoJo resulting in him going to the Kappa River in Tōno, Iwate, to get a better understanding of the concept. Araki claims to be inspired from the art of the 1980s, shading techniques in Western art, and classical paintings; the manga coloring is based on calculations rather than consistency, with Araki citing artists like Paul Gauguin as inspiration. He also claims mystery is the central theme of the manga, as he was fascinated by it as a child. Furthermore, Araki wanted to explore superpowers and energy in JoJo's Bizarre Adventure resulting in various concepts such as Hamon and Stands. He said that the supernatural basis of the fights in his series evened the battlefield for women and children to match up against strong men. For Stardust Crusaders in particular, Araki was influenced by role-playing games in designing the characters' skills.
In creating the manga's generational story, Araki thought much about death and the legacy people leave behind in their lives for their descendants, after the death of his grandfather. He took inspiration from Roots: The Saga of an American Family and East of Eden. Araki focused on Roots for its family-centric story, and he took the idea of intertwined destiny and rivalry between two families from East of Eden. He thought highly of stories that were well-received after changing protagonists, which influenced Araki's decision to kill Jonathan Joestar and write a generational story, passing on his "Spirit" to his own descendants.

The characters had no models, except Jotaro Kujo, who was based on Clint Eastwood. Araki stated that he wanted to try a different type of main character for every part; for example, Part 1's Jonathan Joestar was a serious and honest person, whereas Part 2's Joseph Joestar was a trickster. Although their personalities are different, the two share a physical resemblance in order to have some continuity because it was unheard of in the 1980s for a main character to die in a Weekly Shōnen Jump series. Araki's consistent focus on the Joestar family was intended to give a feeling of pride as well as the wonder and mystery surrounding the lineage.

Araki originally planned the series as a trilogy, with the final confrontation taking place in present-day Japan. However, Araki did not want Part 3 to be a tournament affair, which was popular in Weekly Shōnen Jump at the time, and therefore decided to make it a "road movie" inspired by Around the World in Eighty Days. With Part 4, Araki said that he moved away from "muscle men" as they fell out of popularity with readers and he wanted to focus more on fashion. When designing his characters' outfits, Araki considers both everyday fashion and "cartoonish, bizarre clothing that would be impractical in real life". For Part 6, Araki wrote a female protagonist for the first time which he found complicated, but also interesting due to the humanity she could possess. He later described Part 2's much earlier supporting character Lisa Lisa as fresh and "unheard of" in both manga and society in general for its time, and said it was exciting to challenge people's expectations with the female warrior-type. Having not specifically set out on creating a disabled character, Araki explained that Part 7's paraplegic Johnny Joestar was a natural result of wanting to show a character who could grow, both physically and mentally, during a race where "he would be forced not only to rely on other people, but horses as well."

Araki uses unique onomatopoeia and poses in the series, which he attributes to his love for heavy metal and horror films.

Media

Manga

Written and illustrated by Hirohiko Araki, JoJo's Bizarre Adventure began serialization in the weekly shōnen manga anthology Weekly Shōnen Jumps combined issue #1–2 of 1987, published in Japan by Shueisha on January 1, 1987. The series is divided into eight story arcs, each following the adventures of a new protagonist bearing the "JoJo" nickname. The first part, titled Phantom Blood, was serialized until October 1987 and collected in five tankōbon volumes; the second, Battle Tendency, was serialized from November 1987 to March 1989 and collected in seven volumes. Stardust Crusaders, the third part, was serialized from March 1989 to April 1992 and collected in 16 volumes. Diamond Is Unbreakable, the fourth part, was serialized from April 1992 to November 1995 and collected in 18 volumes; it was followed by the fifth part, Golden Wind, which was serialized from November 1995 to April 1999 and collected in 17 volumes.

After volume 63 (the last volume of Golden Wind), the tankōbon numbering for each subsequent part restarts from one. Stone Ocean, the sixth part, was serialized from January 2000 to April 2003 and collected in 17 volumes. The first 23 chapters of the seventh part, Steel Ball Run, were serialized in Weekly Shōnen Jump from January to October 2004; in March 2005, the series was transferred to the monthly seinen manga magazine Ultra Jump. It ran until April 2011, and was collected in 24 volumes. JoJolion, the eighth part, was serialized from May 2011 to August 2021 and collected in 27 volumes. In the September 2021 issue of Ultra Jump, Araki stated in the author's notes that part 9 of the series, tentatively titled "JOJOLANDS" and later finalized as The JoJoLands, would begin following a short break.

Between 2002 and 2009, the first six parts in the series were re-released by Shueisha in bunkoban format; Steel Ball Run was re-released in the format in 2017 and 2018. A sōshūhen omnibus series recreating the first four parts as they originally appeared in Weekly Shōnen Jump (including color pages, promotional text, and next chapter previews) was published between 2012 and 2016. Since 2012, all eight parts in the series have been digitally colored and distributed by Shueisha for smartphones and tablet computers under the brand name "JOJO-D". A premium hardcover release of the first three parts was published under the brand "JoJonium" between 2013 and 2015.

In the early 1990s, Viz Media reportedly had plans for an English-language release of JoJo's Bizarre Adventure in North America as The Strange Adventures of Jojo; in 2002, the series was unsuccessfully considered for release as monthly comic books. Between November 2005 and December 2010, Viz published Stardust Crusaders, the most well-known part in the series, in 16 volumes. However, the company changed the names of several characters and Stands due to copyright concerns and censored certain scenes, including scenes of animal violence redrawn by Araki himself. In 2013, Viz expressed further interest in localizing the series, but explained its difficulties in doing so due to Araki's numerous references to real musicians and fashion designers. Viz began publishing the JoJonium release of Phantom Blood digitally in September 2014, with a three-volume hardcover print edition following throughout 2015. Battle Tendency was published in four volumes in 2015 and 2016, and Stardust Crusaders was published in ten volumes from 2016 to 2019. Viz continues to publish the series in their own digital and hardcover editions that emulate the JoJonium edition; Diamond Is Unbreakable was published in nine volumes from 2019 to 2021, while Golden Wind began in August 2021. In January 2022, they began releasing Stone Ocean digitally.

Spin-offs

Araki has also authored several manga spin-offs of JoJo's Bizarre Adventure. The first, "Episode 16: At a Confessional", was published as a one-shot in Weekly Shōnen Jump in July 1997. It follows Rohan Kishibe from Diamond Is Unbreakable, and is the first entry in the Thus Spoke Kishibe Rohan series.  follows Yoshikage Kira from Diamond Is Unbreakable; it was published as three chapters in the magazine Allman in June and July 1999. Both one-shots were later published in  a collection of short story manga by Araki published in 1999.  a one-shot featuring the title characters from Stardust Crusaders, was released in October 2002; it is drawn in the style of Boingo's Stand Tohth, a fortune-telling comic book. Between January 2008 and February 2018, six chapters of Thus Spoke Kishibe Rohan were published in various magazines. A tankōbon volume was published by Shueisha in November 2013, collecting the stories "At a Confessional", "Mutsu-kabe Hill", "Millionaire Village", "Poaching Seashore", and "Rohan Kishibe Goes to Gucci". "Mochizuki Family Moon Viewing" was published digitally in September 2014 during the debut of Shueisha's Shōnen Jump+ website; a second tankōbon volume collecting the episode and the stories "Monday, Sunshower", "D.N.A", and "The Run" was published in July 2018.

In the September 2021 issue of Ultra Jump, it was announced that JoJo's Bizarre Adventure would be receiving a spin-off manga written by Kouhei Kadono and illustrated by No Guns Life author Tasuku Karasuma. The spin-off Crazy Diamond's Demonic Heartbreak began publication in the January 2022 issue of Ultra Jump released on December 18, 2021. The spin-off stars Hol Horse and Josuke Higashikata in Morioh and takes place between the events of Stardust Crusaders and Diamond is Unbreakable.

Anime

Studio A.P.P.P.

A 13-episode original video animation adaptation of Part 3, Stardust Crusaders, was produced by A.P.P.P. The first set of six episodes, which begin during the middle of the arc, were released by Pony Canyon on VHS and Laserdisc from 1993 to 1994. The series was released by Klock Worx on DVD and VHS from 2000 to 2002, starting with seven newly-produced prequel episodes adapting the beginning of the arc. Super Techno Arts produced an English-language dub of all thirteen episodes in North America as a six-volume DVD series between 2003 and 2005, with the episodes also arranged in chronological order. A.P.P.P. also produced JoJo's Bizarre Adventure: Phantom Blood, a feature film adaptation of the manga's first arc; it was released theatrically in Japan on February 17, 2007.

David Production

At a July 2012 press conference celebrating the 25th anniversary of the series, Araki announced that an anime adaptation of JoJo's Bizarre Adventure was in production and would premiere in October 2012. The 26-episode first season, which covers the Phantom Blood and Battle Tendency arcs, aired weekly on Tokyo MX between October 2012 and April 2013. Although teased in the post-credit scenes of the finale, a second season adapting Stardust Crusaders was officially announced in October 2013. It aired on Tokyo MX in two halves for a total of 48 episodes; the first from April to September 2014, and the second from January to June 2015. At an event for the anime in October 2015, a third season adapting Diamond Is Unbreakable was announced. It premiered in April 2016 and ended in December 2016, for a total of 39 episodes. A fourth season of the anime adapting Golden Wind was announced at an Araki art exhibition in June 2018. The first episode debuted at Anime Expo in July, and the season aired in 39 episodes from October 2018 to July 2019 on Tokyo MX. At a special event for the anime series on April 4, 2021, an adaptation of Stone Ocean was announced. Unlike the previous seasons, it debuted worldwide on Netflix in December 2021, before receiving a Japanese television broadcast in January 2022.

An original video animation (OVA) based on the "Millionaire Village" episode of the Thus Spoke Kishibe Rohan spin-off manga was distributed in 2017 to those who purchased every DVD or Blu-ray volume of Diamond Is Unbreakable. A second OVA adapting the "Mutsu-kabe Hill" episode was released with a special edition of the manga's second volume in July 2018. Two more OVA episodes adapting the "At a Confessional" and "The Run" episodes were screened in Japanese theaters in December 2019 and released on DVD and Blu-ray in March 2020.

With the 2014 premiere of Stardust Crusaders, American-based website Crunchyroll began streaming the anime series for viewers outside Japan one hour after the episodes aired. Warner Bros. Home Entertainment, who holds the DVD rights to the series, released the first season of the anime in September 2015, with an included English dub. In July 2016, Viz Media announced it acquired the Blu-ray rights to the series; it released the first three seasons with dubs between August 2017 and January 2020. In October 2016, American cable block Adult Swim began airing the anime on its Toonami block.

Other media

Drama CDs
From 1992 to 1993, a drama CD adaptation of Part 3 was released in three volumes, titled   and  They starred Kiyoyuki Yanada as Jotaro, Kenji Utsumi (volumes 1 & 3) and Gorō Naya (volume 2) as Joseph Joestar, Akio Ōtsuka as Avdol, Shō Hayami as Kakyoin, Ken Yamaguchi as Polnareff, Keiichi Nanba as Hol Horse, Shigeru Chiba as J. Geil, and Norio Wakamoto as DIO.

A drama CD adaptation of Part 4 was released from 2016 to 2017 in two parts. The first was titled  and the second  They were only available with the limited edition Blu-ray release of David Production's Diamond Is Unbreakable anime adaptation, and starred Yūki Ono as Josuke, Wataru Takagi as Okuyasu, Yūki Kaji as Koichi, Hiroki Shimowada as Toshikazu, Yuko Lida as Junko, and Takahiro Sakurai as Rohan.

Video games

Several video games based on the series have been created. A titular role-playing video game based on Part 3 was released for the Super Famicom in 1993, and several fighting games have been released, including JoJo's Bizarre Adventure: Heritage for the Future in 1998, JoJo's Bizarre Adventure: All Star Battle for the series' 25th anniversary in 2013, and JoJo's Bizarre Adventure: Eyes of Heaven in 2015. Characters from JoJo's Bizarre Adventure have also been featured in various Weekly Shōnen Jump cross-over games.

Light novels
Several light novels based on the manga have been written, each by a different author, but all including illustrations by Araki. The first, based on Part 3, was simply titled JoJo's Bizarre Adventure, released on November 4, 1993, and written by Mayori Sekijima and Hiroshi Yamaguchi.  written by Gichi Ōtsuka and Miya Shōtarō and based on Part 5, was released on May 28, 2001. Both novels received Italian translations and releases; the first in 2003 with the subtitle The Genesis of Universe, and the second in 2004. In 2000, it was announced that Otsuichi was writing a novel based on Part 4. It proved difficult to complete; in Kono Mystery ga Sugoi! 2005, Otsuichi claimed to have written over 2000 pages, but thrown them all out. His work, The Book: JoJo's Bizarre Adventure 4th Another Day, was released on November 26, 2007. In April 2011, it was announced that Nisio Isin, Kouhei Kadono, and Ōtarō Maijō were each writing light novels in celebration of the series' 25th anniversary. Kadono's, titled  was released on September 16, 2011 and based on Part 5. Nisio's, titled JoJo's Bizarre Adventure Over Heaven, was released on December 16, 2011 and based on Part 3. Maijō's novel, Jorge Joestar, was released on September 19, 2012. It features characters from and inspired by nearly every part of the series.

Art books
Araki has released several books containing original artwork he has produced for JoJo's Bizarre Adventure. JoJo6251 was released on December 10, 1993, and features artwork, story details, and behind the scenes information for Parts 1 through 4. It was followed by JoJo A-Go! Go! on February 25, 2000, which features original artwork focusing on Parts 3 to 5. On September 19, 2013, he released JoJoveller, a multimedia set that includes a book featuring original artwork for Parts 6 through 8; a book detailing the history of the publications; and a book detailing every Stand featured since Stardust Crusaders.

Live-action film

In 2016, it was announced that Toho and Warner Bros. were partnering to produce a live-action film based on Diamond Is Unbreakable. The film was directed by Takashi Miike, stars Kento Yamazaki as Josuke, and was released in Japan on August 4, 2017. Both studios were planning for worldwide distribution and are hoping to create sequels.

Reception

Manga

Sales
JoJo's Bizarre Adventure had over 100 million copies in circulation as of December 2016; it had over 120 million copies in circulation as of December 2021. It is one of the best-selling Weekly Shōnen Jump series of all-time. The first volume of JoJolion was the second best-selling manga for its debut week, its second volume was number three and its third was number two. All three volumes were some of the best-selling manga of 2012. All three volumes of Viz Media's release of Phantom Blood and all four volumes of Battle Tendency reached the top seven positions on The New York Times Manga Best Seller list. According to ICv2, JoJo's Bizarre Adventure was the 8th best-selling manga franchise of fall 2021 (September–December) in the United States.

Critical reception
Reviewing the first volume, IGN named JoJo's Bizarre Adventure a "must read," declaring the artwork of "a standard virtually unseen in most manga produced today." Otaku USAs Joseph Luster called the series "fun as hell" and noted how the beginning is not filled with action like most Weekly Shōnen Jump series, but instead has the tension of horror and thriller films. Rebecca Silverman of Anime News Network wrote that the first volume "combines a fighting story with a solid emotional background, and will absolutely put hair on your chest." She called Dio an excellent villain that the readers can enjoy hating. However, she criticized the anatomy of characters, saying "bodies are often twisted into impossible positions." Comics & Gaming Magazines Cole Watson also strongly praised Dio as the highlight character of Part 1, stating that his eyes were glued to the page whenever he appeared, and described him as "the literal embodiment of Satan in manga form." Watson gave Phantom Blood a 7.5 out of 10, writing that while there is a lot to enjoy, it primarily serves as Dio's origin story and there are some moments that are "agonizingly slow."

Silverman described Part 2 as "less urgent" than Part 1, which allows for more humor and insanity, while still letting the reader get attached to the characters. She felt positively about how strikingly different the protagonist Joseph is from Part 1's Jonathan. However, she wrote that Araki's art had gotten even more "physically improbable," making it difficult to distinguish body parts. When discussing his views on having characters die in a series, writer Gen Urobuchi cited Battle Tendencys Caesar Zeppeli as a character who became "immortal" thanks to his death.

Reviewing Stardust Crusaders, Silverman enjoyed seeing Part 2's Joseph team up with new protagonist Jotaro and was impressed that Araki was able to keep Dio out of Part 2 completely, only to bring him back for Part 3. She initially called the replacement of Hamon with Stands both understandable and a bit of a disappointment, since the "insane physical abilities and contortions" caused by the former were a large source of the fun in the first two parts. Silverman later described Stand battles as exciting and creative in subsequent reviews.

Anime News Network had both Silverman and Faye Hopper review the first volume of Part 4. Silverman called the beginning slower and not as instantly engrossing as the previous parts, but felt this allowed Josuke, whom she and Hopper both described as kinder than the previous protagonists, to develop as a character. Hopper stated that Diamond Is Unbreakable is sometimes criticized for a "lack of a strong narrative throughline" in comparison to other parts, but argued that this is one of its greatest strengths as it allows the main characters to "simply be, lending them an amiable humanity that none of the over-the-top archetypes in the first 3 Parts ever had."

Both Screen Rant's Steven Blackburn and Jordan Richards of AIPT Comics called Golden Wind a breath of fresh air for JoJo's Bizarre Adventure by deviating from the basic formula and following Giorno, son of villain Dio Brando, as he looks to cement a reputation and build a criminal empire. Jenni Lada of Siliconera also praised the protagonist Giorno and said the first volume of Part 5 shows how skilled Araki is at getting people quickly invested in a character and story. She wrote, by giving readers a look at Giorno's past and insights into the person he is now, it emphasizes why he is compelling; "We're introduced to his dream and see him take his first steps toward it." Despite calling the supporting cast a memorable bunch, Richards felt they were underdeveloped as of the first volume, but noted they had potential.

Heidi Kemps, also of Otaku USA, was mostly positive in her review of "Rohan at the Louvre", praising the art for being drawn in full-color by hand, although noted that readers new to JoJo's Bizarre Adventure might not fully understand the ending due to there being only a brief explanation of Rohan's Stand power.

Accolades
For the 10th anniversary of the Japan Media Arts Festival in 2006, Japanese fans voted JoJo's Bizarre Adventure second on a list of the Top 10 Manga of all time. The series ranked 10th in a 2009 survey by Oricon on what manga series people want to see receive a live-action adaptation. The 2013 edition of Kono Manga ga Sugoi!, which surveys people in the manga and publishing industry, named JoJolion the 12th best manga series for male readers. JoJolion won the grand prize for manga at the 2013 Japan Media Arts Festival. In November 2014, readers of Da Vinci magazine voted JoJo's Bizarre Adventure the fifth Weekly Shōnen Jumps greatest manga series of all time. On TV Asahi's Manga Sōsenkyo 2021 poll, in which 150,000 people voted for their top 100 manga series, JoJo's Bizarre Adventure ranked 10th.

Anime
The first set of OVAs was given three out of five stars by Eric Gaede of THEM Anime Reviews. He praised the fight scenes as more believable than those from other series such as Dragon Ball and the characters' personalities, although felt the villains resorted to clichés when they are about to be defeated. However, he called the story "disjointed" and the animation "drab and colorless".

The JoJo's Bizarre Adventure anime television series was named one of the best of 2012 by Otaku USA. It was added to the list by Joseph Luster, however, in his review he cited David Production having a small budget for several of his problems with the series, stating some portions of the animation are a "butt hair above motion comic standards," but that it usually makes up for it in "sheer style." Michael Toole of Anime News Network had similar views, writing that the show's good writing, art direction, and pacing were "sometimes obscured by grade-Z animation."

At the 2013 CEDEC Awards, the anime's opening sequence won in the Visual Arts division. Several critics have credited the success of the anime adaptation for bringing about a surge of popularity for the JoJo's Bizarre Adventure franchise amongst Western audiences. In 2018, Danni Wilmoth of Crunchyroll included the series on her list of "The 20 Series Every Anime Fan Needs to Watch". In 2019, Polygon named the series as one of the best anime of the 2010s.

Gadget Tsūshin listed "Pesci, Pesci, Pesci, Pesci yo!", a quote from the fifteenth episode of Golden Wind, in their 2019 anime buzzwords list.

Controversy
In May 2008, both Shueisha and studio A.P.P.P. halted manga/OVA shipments of JoJo's Bizarre Adventure after a complaint had been launched against them from anonymous online Egyptian Islamic fundamentalists, after noticing a scene in the OVAs that has the villain, Dio Brando, reading a book depicting pages from the Qur'an. This recall affected the English-language releases as well, causing Viz Media and Shueisha to cease publication for a year. Even though the manga did not feature that specific scene, Shueisha had Araki redraw scenes that depicted characters fighting on top of, and destroying, mosques for later printings of the series. Viz resumed publication a year later, with the eleventh volume being published on April 7, 2009. Jason Thompson later included Shueisha's changes to the manga on a list of "The Greatest Censorship Fails" in manga.

Legacy and collaborations
The September 2007 issue of Cell had a cover drawn by Hirohiko Araki with a ligase represented as a JoJo's Bizarre Adventure Stand. He also contributed artwork towards the restoration of Chūson-ji following the 2011 Tōhoku earthquake and tsunami. Araki contributed JoJo-inspired art for Sayuri Ishikawa's 2012 album X -Cross-, where she performs one of the series' iconic poses and is drawn wearing jewelry from the manga. JoJo-style artwork has also been produced for other literature, such as for a 2008 collection featuring Yasunari Kawabata's short story "The Dancing Girl of Izu" and a 2012 reprint of Tamaki Saitō's Lacan for Surviving.

In 2009, Araki's was one of five artists featured in the Louvre's Le Louvre invite la bande dessinée ("The Louvre Invites Comic-Strip Art") exhibition for his artwork of JoJo's Bizarre Adventure. To commemorate this honor, he wrote  a 123-page full color story starring Rohan Kishibe visiting the Louvre and discovering a cursed painting tied to his family. The following year it was published in France and ran in Ultra Jump, and in February 2012 was translated and released in North America by NBM Publishing.

From July 19 to August 18, 2019, the Tower Records store in Shibuya held an exhibit celebrating the finale of the fifth part of the series, Golden Wind, and to promote the release of two games, JoJo's Bizarre Adventure: Pitter Patter Pop! and JoJo's Bizarre Adventure: Last Survivor. The exhibit showed various concept art pieces from the series' artists as well as scripts from the show. Visitors could receive free items such as stickers, folders, and cards upon completion of various tasks, such as answering a quiz or buying a certain amount of items. Each floor of the Tower Records building had a character on display, as a cardboard cutout and on the elevator doors. On August 14, 2019, a panel was held with directors Hideya Takahashi and Yasuhiro Kimura, and producer Kasama.

Several video game characters, such as Street Fighters Guile and Tekkens Paul Phoenix, were inspired by JoJos Polnareff. When they discovered a new species of Neostygarctus in 2013, scientists Shinta Fujimoto and Katsumi Miyazaki named it Neostygarctus lovedeluxe after a Stand from Diamond Is Unbreakable. The song "Don't Bite the Dust" by heavy metal band Lovebites was influenced by and named after a Stand from Diamond Is Unbreakable.

Gucci

From September 17 to October 6, 2011, the Gucci store in Shinjuku hosted the Gucci x Hirohiko Araki x Spur "Rohan Kishibe Goes to Gucci" Exhibition, a collaboration between the luxury Italian clothing brand, Araki, and the Japanese fashion magazine Spur. The exhibit celebrated the 90th anniversary of Gucci and featured a life-size figure of Rohan Kishibe, as well as numerous illustrations by Araki that included actual pieces of the brand's own 2011–2012 fall/winter collection and his own original fashion designs. The October 2011 issue of Spur featured another one-shot manga titled  in which Rohan goes to a Gucci factory to discover the secret behind a magical handbag with the characters wearing and using Gucci products. This was followed by another collaboration in the February 2013 issue of Spur with  starring Jolyne Cujoh from Part 6. A free English translation of the latter was previously available on Gucci's Facebook page. Again, Araki's artwork was featured in Gucci's storefront displays around the world.

25th anniversary
There were several art exhibitions in 2012 in Japan for the manga's 25th anniversary. The first was in Sendai, Araki's birthplace, where a Lawson store was remodeled to look like the "Owson" store that appears in Diamond Is Unbreakable and JoJolion. The store was opened from July 28 to September 30, and contained exclusive goods with the Owson name. The exhibit was taken to Italy from June 28 to July 14, 2013, and shown at the Gucci showroom in Florence.

The October 2012 issue of Ultra Jump contained a special booklet titled 25 Years With JoJo that also celebrated the anniversary; it featured messages and tribute art from well-known manga artists such as Akira Toriyama, Yoshihiro Togashi, Eiichiro Oda, Clamp, and 18 others. During the 25th anniversary celebrations, a special smartphone with a JoJo's Bizarre Adventure-inspired UI was released.

To celebrate the release of the All Star Battle video game created for the 25th anniversary, a special JoJo-themed train traveled the Yamanote Line in Tokyo from August 29 to September 9, 2013. Illustrations and advertisements of the series littered the interior, with videos of the game shown on displays, while the exterior had 33 characters as livery.

Notes

References

External links

  
 JoJo's Bizarre Adventure at Viz Media
 

 
1987 manga
1993 Japanese novels
2001 Japanese novels
2007 Japanese novels
2011 Japanese novels
2012 Japanese novels
Adventure anime and manga
Fantasy anime and manga
Fiction about psychic powers
Light novels
Manga adapted into films
Seinen manga
Shōnen manga
Shueisha franchises
Shueisha manga
Supernatural anime and manga
Vampires in anime and manga